This is a list of candidates for the 1930 New South Wales state election. The election was held on 25 October 1930.

Retiring Members

Labor
 Michael Burke MLA (Phillip)
 James Smith MLA (Hamilton)

Nationalist
 John Fitzpatrick MLA (Orange)
 Carl Glasgow MLA (Waverley)
 Walter Wearne MLA (Barwon)

Other
 H. V. Evatt MLA (Independent Labor, Balmain) — appointed to the High Court

Legislative Assembly
Sitting members are shown in bold text. Successful candidates are highlighted in the relevant colour.

See also
 Members of the New South Wales Legislative Assembly, 1930–1932

References
 

1930